The Point of Rocks Stage Station is a former resting place at the meeting point of the Overland Trail and the Union Pacific Railroad in Sweetwater County, Wyoming, USA. The station served the stage line from 1862 to 1868. In 1868, the Union Pacific line reached Point of Rocks, putting the stage line out of business. The station then became a freight depot for nearby mines, with a road leading to Atlantic City and South Pass. The freight activity declined, and in 1877, the station became a residence. At one point it was allegedly inhabited by Jim McKee, a former member of the Hole in the Wall Gang. It became the property of the state of Wyoming in 1947 and is administered as Point of Rocks Stage Station State Historic Site.

Point of Rocks Station is sited next to the alkaline Bitter Creek, in a valley framed by steep cliffs. The station is a low one-story building, built of local sandstone with mud mortar. The station has burned at least once, and roof construction is a timber structure with metal covering. A stable building is nearby. The station is close to the present-day Interstate 80. It was listed on the National Register of Historic Places on April 3, 1970.

References

External links
Point of Rocks Stage Station State Historic Site Wyoming State Parks, Historic Sites & Trails 
Point of Rocks Stage Station State Historic Site Wyoming State Historical Society
Point of Rocks Stage Station Wyoming State Historic Preservation Office
Point of Rocks Stage Station, Rock Springs vicinity, Point of Rocks, Sweetwater, WY Library of Congress Historic American Buildings Survey (HABS)
Point of Rocks Stage Station, Stable, Rock Springs vicinity, Point of Rocks, Sweetwater, WY Library of Congress Historic American Buildings Survey (HABS)

Stagecoach stations on the National Register of Historic Places in Wyoming
Buildings and structures completed in 1862
Buildings and structures in Sweetwater County, Wyoming
Historic American Buildings Survey in Wyoming
Wyoming state historic sites
Pre-statehood history of Wyoming
Tourist attractions in Sweetwater County, Wyoming
1862 establishments in Nebraska Territory
National Register of Historic Places in Sweetwater County, Wyoming
Overland Trail
IUCN Category III